Franziska Hofmann (born 27 March 1994) is a German athlete specialising in the sprint hurdles. She finished fourth at the 2015 European U23 Championships.

Her personal bests in the event are 12.87 seconds in the 100 metres hurdles (+2.0 m/s, Ulm 2014) and 8.12 seconds in the 60 metres hurdles (Chemnitz 2016).

International competitions

1Disqualified in the final

References

External links 
 
 

1994 births
Living people
German female hurdlers
People from Frankenberg, Saxony
Athletes (track and field) at the 2010 Summer Youth Olympics
Athletes (track and field) at the 2019 European Games
European Games medalists in athletics
European Games bronze medalists for Germany
Sportspeople from Saxony